Şotlanlı (also, Shotlanly) is a village and municipality in the Aghjabadi Rayon of Azerbaijan.  It has a population of 285.

References 

Populated places in Aghjabadi District